A collective of fictional characters that appear in the American comic books published by DC Comics that feature the superhero, Batman, as the main protagonist.

Since Bat-Family's introduction in 1939, the character has accumulated a number of recognizable supporting characters. The first Batman supporting character was Commissioner James Gordon, who first appeared in the same comic book as Batman in Detective Comics #27 (May 1939). James Gordon is also Batman's ally in the Gotham City Police Department. Robin, Batman's vigilante partner, was introduced in the Spring of 1940, Alfred Pennyworth, Batman's butler, was introduced in 1943, and Barbara Gordon was introduced in 1967.

The "Batman family", or "Bat-Family", is the informal term for Batman's closest allies; generally masked vigilantes operating in Gotham City. Batman also forms strong bonds or close working relationships with other superheroes, including Justice League members Superman, Green Arrow, Zatanna and Wonder Woman as well as members of the Outsiders superhero team. Others such as Jason Bard, Harold, Onyx, and Toyman work for him.

In addition, Batman has perhaps the most well known collection of adversaries in fiction. They are commonly referred to as Batman's rogues gallery and include the Joker, the Penguin, and the Riddler, among others. He also has several love interests, including Catwoman, Talia al Ghul, Silver St. Cloud, Poison Ivy, and Julie Madison.

Bat-Family
The Bat-Family (sometimes called Gotham Knights) is the informal name for Batman's closest allies. They are generally masked vigilantes who either have been trained by Batman or operate in Gotham City with his tacit approval. Many of these are also his adopted children with the exception of Damian Wayne, the first of the Robins to be biologically related to Batman.

The group consists of similarly minded superheroes who operate in the Gotham City area and work towards achieving common goals. Batman is often the team leader or, in some cases, its dispatch. Various members of the group usually interact with one another and assist in each other's cases, even within their respective series. Although some members occasionally resent Batman's intrusion into their lives, all respect him as a legend within the superhero community and rarely dare to challenge his authority. Most of the members also have a strong rapport with Batman. In a 2002 storyline in which Bruce Wayne is accused of murder, Batman's friends gather to prove his innocence. It has also been implied through Batman's history that this network serves as a surrogate family for Batman and keeps him from slipping too far into his ruthless vigilante persona.

Current members

Batman Inc.

Five years in the future (Futures End)

Deceased members

Status unclear

The New 52

Pre-New 52

Former members

Gotham City Police Department

The GCPD were featured in their own series: the limited series Batman: GCPD and the ongoing series Gotham Central, in which they investigate the unusual crimes that plague the city, in a personal effort to minimize Batman's involvement. The Gotham Central series ended its 40-issue run in 2006.

DC superhero allies

Batman regularly interacts with other DC superheroes in titles such as Justice League of America. A few, however, have had a marked presence in the core Batman titles:

Antagonists

Batman comics have introduced many classic villains. His rogues gallery is one of the most identifiable in modern fiction. The Joker, the Riddler, Catwoman, Two-Face, Harley Quinn, and the Penguin are some of the most recognizable foes; other notable villains include Poison Ivy, Ra's al Ghul, Mr. Freeze, the Scarecrow, Bane, Killer Croc, the Mad Hatter, and Clayface, among others. Some of Batman's rogues gallery are notable for sometimes functioning as allies as well as villains. Some examples of this are Catwoman, the Riddler, Poison Ivy, Two-Face (Harvey Dent), the Red Hood, Anarky, and Talia al Ghul. Recently, emphasis on the psychological motivations of Batman villains have painted them in a much more sympathetic light than in their earlier stories, most notably Mr Freeze and the Ventriloquist in their Batman: The Animated Series incarnations.

Love interests
Unlike his peers from DC Universe, like Superman, Flash, Green Lantern etc., Batman never had an official single love interest, but several of them in its publishing history.

Bruce Wayne's love interests
 Selina Kyle (Catwoman):
 Catwoman is the most enduring romantic interest of Batman/Bruce Wayne. In All Star Batman and Robin the Boy Wonder Batman's feelings towards her are based on the fact that she is sort of a female version of himself: another dark, beautiful creature that prowls in the night. In the current timeline, Batman and Catwoman became romantically involved during the Batman: Hush story arc. Batman ended the relationship because he was afraid if they had a relationship that Hush would use her to get to him and also doubted her loyalty to him questioning if she was part of the plot to destroy his life. Even when their romance rekindled later on, Batman still suspected that Selina's reformation could be a result of a personality-altering mindwipe by Zatanna. Later in Batman: Heart of Hush in an attempt to kill Bruce, Hush kidnaps Catwoman and cuts out her heart, when Bruce returns the heart he admits to Selina that she really was the only woman to have held his heart and that he would always love her.
 In Pre-Crisis continuity, the Earth-Two versions of Batman and Catwoman were shown to have married in the 1950s, and later Selina gave birth to a daughter, Helena Wayne (alias Huntress) in 1957.
 In Tim Burton's film Batman Returns, Selina (played by Michelle Pfeiffer) seems to be the true love of Bruce's life, as not only their costumed identities but also their disturbed psyches are described as similar. Their relationship becomes intensely dramatic towards the end of the movie, to the point where Bruce actually implores her to abandon her vendetta against Max Shreck and come and live with him in Wayne Manor (in the movie's official comic book adaptation, during the confrontation with Shreck, they reveal that they love each other). She was set to reappear in Batman Forever, portrayed again by Pfeiffer, but Joel Schumacher scrapped the idea. However, Kyle was referenced by Chase Meridian.
 In Christopher Nolan's film The Dark Knight Rises, Selina Kyle (never referred to as Catwoman in the film) is portrayed by an actress Anne Hathaway as she is in the comics as a thief who aids Bane in hopes of obtaining the "clean slate" drive to erase her criminal record and to see the rich and selfish of Gotham suffer. She later aids Batman in stopping Bane after realizing her mistake of betraying him to the terrorist, giving up her own chance to escape Gotham and leave him behind. At the film's end, she is seen in Italy wearing Martha Wayne's necklace (which she stole earlier on in the film) and dating Bruce Wayne, who has retired from the mantle of Batman. 
 In Batman: The Animated Series, Bruce Wayne regularly dates Selina Kyle. In Batman Beyond, Bruce hints at a relationship with Selina in his past, as well as comparing that relationship with Terry's and the current Ten of the Royal Flush Gang. As in comic books, the sexual tension between their costumed characters is a major story point in Batman: The Animated Series. In the comic book adaption Batman: Gotham Adventures #33, the Phantom Stranger shows Bruce a world where he never became Batman, married Selina and had two sons.
 In Batman: the Brave and the Bold, Batman and Catwoman marry in an alternate future and she is the mother of Damian. However, this future is later revealed to have all been a story written by Alfred Pennyworth. 
 After The New 52, as it is Selina's early days as Catwoman she does not yet know Batman's identity, though it is evident they engaged in sexual intercourse.
 In Gotham, a 14-year-old Selina Kyle witnesses the murders of Thomas and Martha Wayne. Because of that, she stays at Wayne Manor to be protected, where she befriends the young Bruce Wayne. She saves him from a gang of hired killers and gives him his first kiss. Since then, the young Bruce and Selina have formed a very close relationship.
 Talia al Ghul: The daughter of the supervillain, Ra's al Ghul, Talia's father has encouraged the relationship in hopes of recruiting Batman as his successor. Unlike Catwoman, Talia is more than willing to play second-fiddle to Bruce's mission.
 The two are at odds, as Talia has been brainwashed into hating both her father and Batman; however, she claims to be the mother of his son Damian, introduced in Batman #656. However, after Damian is murdered by a clone created by her, Batman is no longer affectionate towards her as he was in the past due to her indirect involvement in their son's death, making him increasingly vengeful. 
 In the now out-of-continuity graphic novel Batman: Son of the Demon, Talia bore his son (later named Ibn al Xu'ffasch).
 In Earth-22's Kingdom Come, Talia admires Batman in his drive, determination, and nobility, but is always torn between him and his love for her terrorist father.
 In Christopher Nolan's film The Dark Knight Rises, Talia is played by actress Marion Cotillard. In the film, she is incognito as philanthropist and socialite Miranda Tate (a ploy used by her father with his false identity of Henri Ducard) and begins an affair with Bruce Wayne as well as becoming a Wayne Enterprises executive. Talia has assumed control of the League of Shadows and plans with Bane, who saved her as a child, to kill Bruce and destroy Gotham to fulfil her father's mission and have vengeance for his death.
 Julie Madison:
 In the earliest Batman comics, Bruce Wayne dates the often-imperiled Julie Madison, an actress and socialite. The two eventually separate and Julie weds into European royalty, much in the manner of Grace Kelly. 
 In the New 52, Julie appears in a flashback-dream sequence as Bruce's college girlfriend. She reappeared later, this time in the present time, as she has moved back to Gotham and wants to be reunited with Bruce. Alfred imagines what it would be like if Bruce and Julie got together and made a family, having a life without Batman. Unfortunately, Bruce could not meet with Julie because he was busy with crime fighting, much to Alfred's displeasure. In Batman #43, Julie is the head of a clinic for underprivileged youth that Bruce Wayne is helping to finance and manage. After the events of Batman: Endgame, Bruce Wayne has begun a relationship with Julie and works for her in the clinic. 
 In Batman & Robin, Elle Macpherson plays Julie, Bruce's girlfriend, though the character seems to have little in common with her comic book self. The character adds little to the plot, and many of her scenes were edited out of the film's final cut.
 Vicki Vale:
 In several 1950s stories, a reporter for the Gotham Gazette newspaper Vicki Vale, was shown as an occasional romantic interest of Batman. Vicki Vale returned in the early 1980s, brought back by Doug Moench.
 Vale appeared in the second of Columbia's Batman serials, Batman and Robin, portrayed by Jane Adams.
 Kim Basinger plays Vicki in the 1989 film Batman. In the movie, she has come to Gotham City to do a story on Batman, but she soon becomes romantically involved with Bruce Wayne, unaware that he and Batman are the same person. Eventually, Vicki does learn Bruce's secret identity. At the end of the film, Alfred Pennyworth chauffeurs her to Wayne Manor to await Bruce's return once the night's crime fighting is done. In Batman Returns, it is stated that she eventually left Bruce because she could not cope with his double life. In the early scripts of Returns, she was set to reappear, but Tim Burton scrapped the idea.
 In the animated film The Batman vs. Dracula, Vale is romantically linked to Bruce Wayne, even going as far as to mention the kind of impact the death of his parents could have on him, hinting that Vicki may know he is Batman.
 In the video game Batman: Arkham Knight, Vicky apologizes to Bruce Wayne about a news article, apparently published by Jack Ryder, and asks "Brucie" to call her back. When talking to Jack Ryder as Batman, he reveals that Vale is dating Bruce Wayne, although Wayne never mentioned this in the game itself.
 Katherine "Kathy" Webb-Kane (Batwoman)
 In the original Pre-Crisis continuity, Kathy Kane is a wealthy Gotham City heiress and former circus performer who decides to use her skills and resources to become a costumed crimefighter. This is partly out of altruism and partly to attract the romantic attention of Batman. While Batman wished for Kane to retire from crimefighting due to the danger, she remained his ally. Kathy was romantically interested in Batman but Batman remained aloof until her death at the hands of Bronze Tiger. In the New 52's title Batman Incorporated, it was revealed that Kathy was recruited into a covert spy organization called Spyral and as part of her first assignment, Kathy was tasked with tracking down Batman and discovering his true identity. Donning a female variation of Batman's costume to gain his attention, she embarked on a career as a costumed crime-fighter while attempting to get close to Batman. Her plan succeeded but the two fell in love with one another, despite Kathy legally being Wayne's aunt through her marriage with his mother's brother, the late Nathan Kane. As a result, she refused to reveal his identity to her superiors at Spyral. Later, Kathy was threatened by Dr Dedalus to expose her to Batman unless she continued her mission. Heartbroken, she broke off her relationship with Bruce to save him from Dedalus' plan. Kathy reappears alive in the concluding issue of Batman Incorporated, in which she shoots Talia al Ghul dead in the Batcave, saving Batman's life. Identifying herself as St Hadrian's headmistress and requesting Batman not to go looking for her, she thanks Batman for leading Talia into her trap.
 In a Pre-Crisis Earth-Two, Kathy, who is a middle-aged woman, is still in love with the now-deceased Commissioner Bruce Wayne.
 In Batman: Mystery of the Batwoman, while investigating the identity of Gotham's newest masked vigilante, Batman develops an affection for one of the suspects, Kathy Duquesne, daughter of mob boss Carlton Duquesne.
 Linda Page: 
 Linda appeared during the Golden Age of Comics after Julie broke her engagement off with Bruce. A former socialite, she dedicated her time as a nurse for the elderly, instead of falling into the stereotype that rich women were spoiled and lazy. She dated Bruce for two years, but broke up with him when he would not explain why he seemed to be wooing another woman (trying to reform a disguised Catwoman).
 Linda appeared in the first Batman serial (1943), portrayed by Shirley Patterson.
 Silver St. Cloud: A storyline in the late 1970s featured Silver St. Cloud, who managed to deduce the secret of Bruce Wayne's alter ego, but she could not handle being involved with someone in such a dangerous line of work. The two parted ways; 2005 six-issue miniseries Batman: Dark Detective features a return appearance of Silver St. Cloud, although the romance has not been rekindled. In Batman: The Widening Gyre, she and Bruce rekindle their romance on an island beach her family owns. Shortly after the two become engaged, Silver is murdered by the disguised villain Onomatopoeia by slicing Silver's throat and mimicking the sound of the blade.
 In Gotham, a young Silver, the step-niece and ward of corrupt billionaire Theo Galavan, befriends and later starts dating the young Bruce Wayne, who is immediately smitten with her. Unbeknownst to him, Silver is helping Galavan in the Sacred Order of Saint Dumas' plan to kill Bruce and take over Wayne Enterprises. Bruce plans a fake abduction of Silver and himself to make her reveal everything she knows about his parents and her uncle's plan. The plan works and Bruce finally sees Silver for who she really is, leaving her behind stunned and tearful. Later on in the series, Theo breaks into Wayne Manor and kidnaps Bruce. Silver, not wanting to witness Bruce's death, pretends she's feeling unwell. Theo accuses her of being weak and tells her to make Bruce fall in love with her again to prove she is worthy of the Dumas' name. She has a change of heart and tries to help Bruce escape, but their attempts are thwarted by Theo, and they're both jailed. Bruce, knowing about Silver's initial motivations, kisses her in front of Theo and forgives her. Bruce is then tied to a stake, where Father Creel prepares to kill him. Gordon and Cobblepot arrive with a group of henchmen and begin to fight the Order while Bruce is freed by Alfred and Selina Kyle. Theo and his sister, Tabitha, try to escape using parachutes. Before they go, Theo expresses his disappointment in Silver and appears as though he might kill her, but instead is knocked unconscious by Tabitha, who says she is tired of Theo's bullying. The women escape using the parachutes but leave Theo in the penthouse and he is then arrested by Gordon.
 Julia Pennyworth: The daughter of Alfred and a French Resistance fighter named Mlle. Marie, Julia was brought in by Gerry Conway in Detective Comics #501 (1981) as a potential love interest for Bruce. In the New 52, Julia is a Special Reconnaissance Regiment member and first appears in Hong Kong, where she notices the Batplane and seems not too pleased, fearing that Batman might ruin everything she has planned. Julia later meets Batman and tries to fight him off, telling him she has planned to take down the crime lord known as Shen Fang, whom Batman is also after. During the fight, Julia is impaled through the torso, so Bruce takes her with him back at Gotham. Initially dismissing Bruce as a useless fop and feeling that her father has wasted his life, once Julia learns about Bruce's life as Batman, she joins the team, basically taking on her father's role after Alfred is hospitalized by Hush's attack. She also assists the GCPD and the Powers Corporation when James Gordon temporarily became a corporate-sponsored Batman after the apparent death of the original Dark Knight. 
 Julia Pennyworth appears in Batwoman played by Christina Wolfe.
 Julia Pennyworth appears in Catwoman: Hunted voiced by Lauren Cohan.
 Vesper Fairchild: Fairchild's relationship with Bruce Wayne was established during Doug Moench's second run on Batman in the 1990s. A radio show host who left Gotham after the "No Man's Land" crisis, Fairchild was later killed by David Cain on orders from Lex Luthor as part of Luthor's attempt to get revenge on Bruce Wayne for his involvement in thwarting his attempt to take control of Gotham after "No Man's Land" ended.
 Vesper Fairchild is featured in the TV shows set in the Arrowverse:
 In the Arrow episode "Elseworlds, Part 2", Oliver Queen reveals that he slept with Vesper to persuade her into leaving Queen Consolidated out of her exposé on white-collar crime.
 Vesper Fairchild is featured in Batwoman voiced by Rachel Maddow. In the pilot episode, Vesper is first heard talking about "Batman's return" in light of Batwoman stopping the bomb plot of the Wonderland Gang. She is also heard talking about different things in Gotham City like different criminal activities.
 Jezebel Jet: A wealthy former supermodel of African descent. She is said to own an African province. Like Bruce, she lost her parents at a young age. Though she resisted Bruce's affections at first, she ultimately began a relationship with him. As a result, she discovered that Bruce was Batman just before Batman R.I.P.. Later, she is revealed to be a member of the Black Glove, a villainous organization aimed at defeating Batman. She was apparently killed by a flock of Man-Bat Commandos created by Talia but was later hinted to have somehow survived in Batman Inc. #8. Her death was confirmed in Batman Incorporated: Leviathan Strikes! #1.
 A character based on Jezebel appears in Batwoman, portrayed by Robin Givens. Jada Jet is the CEO of Jeturian Industries, an associate of the Black Glove Society, and the mother of Marquis Jet and Ryan Wilder, the show's titular character. Due to the fact that Marquis at a young age has been attacked in the head by Joker's joy buzzer which caused him to develop sociopath tendencies, Jada works to find a cure for Marquis even if she has to preserve him upon the perfection of the frozen serum that Black Glove work to recreate.
 Lois Lane: In the pre-Flashpoint continuity, Lois knew Bruce Wayne was Batman and they still have a very close friendship. Lois also helps him keep an eye on the "reformed" Penguin while at a party of Wayne's.
 In an imaginary story, in Superman's Girlfriend, Lois Lane #89, Lois and Bruce not only were dating but they eventually got married.
 In a crossover between Superman: The Animated Series and The New Batman Adventures, World's Finest, Bruce Wayne dates Daily Planet star reporter Lois Lane after meeting her at Metropolis Airport. However, she breaks off the relationship after she discovers that he is Batman. Bruce points out the irony to Superman that she likes Bruce Wayne and Superman, but not their respective alter egos.
 Sasha Bordeaux: Assigned as Bruce Wayne's bodyguard, Sasha deduced that Bruce was Batman. She was framed for Fairchild's murder and later joined Maxwell Lord's Checkmate organization. During The OMAC Project, Bordeaux was turned into a cyborg OMAC, but this incident has since been resolved. While Sasha and Batman kissed near the end of The OMAC Project, their relationship seems to have passed on.
 Diana of Themyscira/Diana Prince (Wonder Woman): Diana and Bruce briefly dated within the pages of the Justice League of America comics but nothing came of the relationship and the two remain friends. In Blackest Night: Wonder Woman, their past relationship is referenced when Wonder Woman is able to use her feelings, for Bruce to throw off the influence of her Black Lantern ring and join the Star Sapphires.
 The mutual romantic interest is echoed in the Justice League animated series and its sequel series, but Bruce and Diana seem to grow very close in both shows and care deeply for one another, and even Batman hints at romance between them in the episodes "This Little Piggy" and "Once and Future Thing: Weird Western Tales", in the former episode however while she is interested in pursuing a relationship he is not and he says that he cannot be with her for the following reasons: dating on the team would lead to disaster (presumably referring to the ill-fated relationship between John Stewart and Hawkgirl), that they are very different people and his fear that Diana would end up becoming a target for his enemies who would seek to threaten him via a loved one in spite of her demonstrations of being perfectly capable of handling difficult situations. In the comic book adaptation of the DCAU Batman Beyond Universe, however, revealing that she marries Batman's Justice Lord counterpart, leaving him heartbroken of losing his chance with her.
 Dinah Laurel Lance (Black Canary): Although Black Canary has a relationship with Green Arrow, she has shown an attraction to the Dark Knight and she and Batman have shared kisses from time to time.
 In Thrillkiller '62, Batman and Dinah Drake Lance share a kiss.
 In All-Star Batman and Robin the Boy Wonder #7, the two show more of an attraction to one another. As she watches Batman in action, she gets exhilarated. As the fight concludes, she leaps down and begins kissing Batman. The two maintain their passion for a short time until Batman decides it is time to leave. He offers to give Black Canary a lift home.
 Zatanna Zatara: In Detective Comics #843-844, Zatanna and Bruce talk about the possibility of having a more meaningful relationship. But later they both understand that Bruce could not give her the relationship she wishes for due to his focus on crime-fighting.
 In Batman: The Animated Series, while a young Bruce Wayne studies escape artistry under Zatara the Magician, he has a relationship with Zatara's daughter. When she later becomes the magician crimefighter, Zatanna, she and Batman maintain a working relationship.
 Bekka: Orion's wife, she and Batman had a strong attraction to each other after she rescued him from Darkseid's forces on the planet Tartarus. She was later murdered.
 In Justice League Beyond, when the new Batman, Terry McGinnis, visits Apokolips and meets Queen Bekka, she makes a pass at him and it is alluded that Bruce and Bekka had a fling, with a now older Bruce not wanting to talk about it and Superman saying "it's complicated".
 Pamela Lillian Isley (Poison Ivy): Although Poison Ivy has been historically portrayed as a supervillainess, Batman and Poison Ivy have worked together in achieving common goals and are frequently depicted as having a romantic relationship. Batman's attraction to Ivy is present in some way in several mediums in which the characters appear. There has always been a sexual tension between the two, most notably in their canonical earlier encounters. In her first appearance, Poison Ivy is established as having an attraction to Batman, and tries to convince Batman to join her side and creates love potions that ensnare him. In the 1997 story Batman: Poison Ivy, Christopher DeJardin tries to kill Ivy, and Batman takes the bullet. Batman, who was wearing body armor, knocks him out. Ivy considers his saving her from death as proof he loves her, though he responds that she does not know the meaning of the word. Her attraction is confirmed in Widening Gyre. At first, Ivy's infatuation with Batman was one-sided; later stories presented the attraction as more mutual, but hindered by reluctance on Batman's part. She later kisses Bruce during a robbery, poisoning him. But when she subsequently kisses a dying Batman, she unknowingly cures her intended victim and establishes a budding romantic tension between them. During the "No Man's Land" story arc, Batman comes to her rescue while she is held captive by Clayface, with Ivy remarking that she knew he would. In Batman: Pavane (1989), while being interviewed as a potential candidate for the Suicide Squad, Pamela reveals to Inspector Stuart on how she became Poison Ivy. When she heard about Batman, she instantly fell in love with him—believing him to be the “perfect man”; going so far as to make a love shrine of him. With her goal set, she moved to Gotham, created a costume and renamed herself “Poison Ivy”; she then began committing crimes for the purpose of getting his attention in the hopes of them becoming the #1 crime couple. Unfortunately for Pamela, it did not work out the way she wanted it to, and so she was apprehended and sent to Arkham Asylum. In Batman: Hothouse (1992), Batman gains an obsession with Isley. Later, she kisses him. Now completely deranged, Ivy thinks herself "Titania, Queen of the May", and Batman her Oberon - as Batman struggles with the hallucinations induced by the kiss, she pins him down and prepares to unmask him. With his last burst of strength, Batman kicks the greenhouse's sprinklers on, washing away Ivy's pheromones. The sobered Batman chases an increasingly desperate Ivy onto the greenhouse's catwalks, where he barely manages to save Ivy from falling to her death. Subsequently, Ivy is returned to Arkham Asylum, her twisted love for Batman now stronger than ever. In one of the annuals of Batman: Shadow of the Bat, a mutual attraction between Poison Ivy and the Batman is obvious right from the start. Ivy considers Batman "the perfect man", and in a conversation with his butler, Alfred Pennyworth, he admits to finding her attractive and more appealing than Catwoman. In the Batman Chronicles (1995) story Passion's Fruit (1997), Ivy is depicted as feeling lonely and deeply missing Batman while at Arkham Asylum. She hatches a scheme to unleash some of her plant creations to cause havoc in Gotham, multiplying at contact with water, until Batman finally pays her a visit at the asylum. In exchange for the visit and a kiss, she morphs her creations into harmless strawberry plants. At the end of the story, she is seen to be in improved spirits. In the 2004 story Poison Ivy: Cast Shadows, Batman and Ivy work together to find a killer carrying out a series of Ivy-like murders at Arkham. His butler, Alfred Pennyworth, notes that Batman has been poisoned by the flowers. Batman tells Alfred he must kiss Poison Ivy for the cure, and that if he fails Alfred must kill him. Ivy and Batman confront each other, where Batman warns Ivy that he will have to knock her out to kiss her to make sure that she does not kill him when he passes out after being cured. Ivy insists for him to trust her, despite Batman's doubts. Batman at first decides to punch her, hesitates, then they embrace and kiss passionately instead. Upon being cured, he falls, but saves himself, and saves Ivy as Gotham Tower collapses when — assuming Batman dead — Poison Ivy tries to kill herself, once more insinuating that it is more than just lust she feels for him. Ivy and Batman share a moment together speaking, watching her plant creations create light, and Batman compliments her on her talent. Batman takes Ivy back to Arkham Asylum, so that Ivy can finish her rehabilitation. Discouraged, Ivy complains to Batman about the lack of light in her cell, and Batman responds that there is nothing he can do about it, before departing. Transferred to a new cell the next morning, Ivy is stunned when she discovers that someone has had her room moved to a special cell where she can be in the sunlight, and has been filled with flowers as a gift. Upon being told some "anonymous benefactor" wanted to make sure her time is not as daunting as it might have been, a touched Ivy smiles and thanks Batman. In Gothtopia, Batman comes to her rescue when he realizes she was telling him the truth, even though he put her in Arkham. First she punches him for not believing her claims, and then she kisses him for coming to her rescue, poisoning him with her mind control toxin. Resisting it, he warns that they would be best off helping each other for now. Thanks to her own resistance and the kiss he received, both Batman and Ivy become immune to the effects of the Scarecrow's fear gas. The relationship even briefly deviated from the Batman/Ivy relationship into a Bruce/Pamela one when, in the comic series Batman: Gotham Knights, he helps her return to normal. In The New 52, Ivy is shown to have some level of infatuation with Batman, even calling him "the only one" for her, though this is no longer apparent from DC Rebirth onwards.
 She is portrayed in the 1997 film Batman & Robin by Uma Thurman. At a charity ball, she unexpectedly appears to get the Heart of Isis diamond necklace. Blowing around a wisp of pheromone dust, she offers the auctioneers present a night with her. Batman and Robin, also hit by the pheromone dust, get in on the auctioning action themselves.
 In Gotham, a young Ivy "Pamela" Pepper (portrayed by Clare Foley) is shown to have a crush on a young Bruce Wayne, in the episode "Lovecraft". Later on, in "A Beautiful Darkness", an artificially aged-up Ivy (portrayed by Peyton List) kisses Bruce on the lips so as to hypnotise him, even though she could've done so by simply making him smell the scent of her perfume, like how she hypnotised everyone else. In "The Trial of Jim Gordon", Ivy interrupts Bruce and Selina's date, having come to take Bruce to use him in her plan. She states that Bruce will love her, and after hypnotising him once more, kisses him again.
 Natalia Knight (Nocturna): Nocturna a.k.a. Natalia Knight. Created by Doug Moench in the early 1980s. She was a jewel thief who briefly adopted Jason Todd and knew that Bruce Wayne was Batman. She had a rare "light sensitivity" disease and her skin was bleached white. She disappeared during the last days of Pre-Crisis Batman after being stabbed by her step-brother Charles (originally known as the Thief of Night and then known as Night-Slayer), floating into the crimson sky of the Crisis in her balloon.
 April Clarkson (Midnight): A Lieutenant of the Gotham PD, who was against Batman and was taking credit for his work. April was working on the same case as Batman did, searching for the murderous villain, Midnight. During her investigation, she gets a visit from Batman and both are surprised by an unexpected attraction. In his civilian identity, Bruce begins to flirt with April, although being aware that she is working on the same case. She initially rejects him, but he becomes more attracted to her. Batman's attraction towards April is noticed by his closest allies, who warn him to be careful. In the end, April is revealed to be the psychopathic murderer.
 Jaina "Jai" Hudson (White Rabbit): The daughter of an American diplomat and a Bollywood actress, a charity fundraiser organizer who meets Bruce Wayne at one of her charity functions to raise funds for relief in Pakistan. During the event there was a flirtatious exchange between the two. They later began dating. During that time, Batman encountered a mysterious criminal called White Rabbit. Batman first meets her during the breakout of Arkham Asylum, where she teased Batman and the Gotham City Police Department before running off into the corridors. He later finds the alluring White Rabbit, responding to a tip off about the location of the Joker, but she only continues to tease him and asks him to chase her. Batman chases her for answers but when he finally finds her in a compartment, White Rabbit is seen lounging over the Joker (Clayface in disguise). After his fight with Clayface, White Rabbit sensually strokes Batman's face as she prepares to inject him with an unknown substance but is interrupted by the Flash. Later, White Rabbit leads Batman to a confrontation with Scarecrow and Bane. Escaping, White Rabbit returns to Jaina's home and they combine into a single person.
 Mio (Penumbra): A young assassin, working for Ra's al Ghul, who fell in love with Bruce Wayne during his training to become Batman.
 Madolyn Corbett: A close associate of Bruce Wayne, who was obsessed with him. Her fascination with him led her to begin stalking him outside his house. After he rejected her offer of marriage, she soon killed herself and tried to frame Bruce for it.
 Erin and Shannon McKillen: Erin McKillen and her twin sister Shannon were born into the McKillen crime family. When they were little, they attended school with Bruce Wayne and Erin used to steal kisses from him but Bruce was fonder of Shannon as they were very close and she also was the first person to make him talk about his parents after their deaths. Upon the death of their father, the two sisters took control of the McKillen family and with the pass of time they did not keep in touch with Bruce. They were eventually arrested and sent to Blackgate Penitentiary, betrayed by their defense attorney, Harvey Dent. With their escape from prison resulting in the death of Shannon, Erin decided to leave Gotham, but not before taking her revenge on Dent. When she returned to Gotham years later she confronts Batman who after a fight merely welcomes her back to Gotham, putting her in jail once again. In the jail Erin calls Bruce, who is unsure of why she called him at all. Erin responds that she had wanted to reach out to one of her oldest friends. Later Bruce moves Erin to the Wayne Manor to protect her from Two Face and anyone else who wants her dead. Recalling back to their childhood, Erin wonders which of the McKillen sisters Bruce liked more with him admitting it was Shannon. Before leaving the Manor, Bruce offers her a moral lesson of Cherokee origin as there is still hope for Erin, in his eyes. Later having saved her from both Two Face and the crime families who are after her, Batman asks her help in locating Dent who is in danger but she leads him on so he cannot prevent Dent's execution. Batman decides to eject Erin from the car, leaving her for the cops.
 Shondra Kinsolving: Shondra is a psychic and the half-sister of Benedict Asp. She had a brief love affair with Batman, having been brought in to help him when he broke his back. Before Bruce could officially commit to her, Benedict kidnapped her and turned her abilities to evil use. Batman eventually defeated Benedict, but the damage to Shondra's mind was too great. As she healed Bruce's lingering injuries, Shondra's psyche regressed back into childhood. However, she recently made a cameo in Batman: Hush as one of the doctors assisting in Bruce Wayne's operation.
 Jillian Maxwell: In Batman: Legends of the Dark Knight Halloween Special #1, (reprinted in the trade paperback Batman: Haunted Knight) during the beginning of his career, Bruce finds himself attracted to a woman who called herself Jillian Maxwell after meeting her at a costume party. However, Alfred's suspicion of her led him to checking her background, discovering a criminal record of a woman, whose description matches Jillian's, who used the aliases of Kathryn Cole, Christine Gherard, Diana Lopez, Pamela Weisman, and many other identities to seduce young wealthy men for their fortunes, then later arrange events that led to their deaths so she can have their wealth. After Alfred told Bruce of this, he was heartbroken, but Bruce kept an eye on the woman. When she used the identity Audrey Marguerite in Brazil, Bruce, as Batman, sent her a note, telling her to confess all her crimes.
 Rachel Caspian: In a 1987 storyline "Batman: Year Two", Bruce Wayne falls in love with Rachel. Unfortunately, Rachel's father moonlighted as a murderous vigilante who committed suicide once losing a battle against a gun-wielding Batman. Discovery of her father's evils drove Rachel to pay her father's penance on his behalf by enrolling in a nunnery and breaking off her engagement with Bruce Wayne, who had prepared himself to end his crime fighting career to marry her.
 Lorna Shore: In Batman Confidential - Lovers & Madmen, Bruce met a museum curator Lorna Shore during the beginning of his career. It was love at first sight as Bruce was able to find peace when he was with her for the first time since he was 8 years old after his parents' murder. However, after his encounter with the Joker and realizing that there will be more enemies like him, he broke off their relationship to protect Lorna. Lorna later left the city, feeling that Gotham is not safe anymore because of Batman and the Joker.
 Mallory Moxon: Mallory became involved in Bruce's life when Philo Zeiss wanted revenge on her father, Lew Moxon. Bruce has spent as a child a happy summer with her before his parents were killed. He meets her again years later in a reception to honor Moxon's return to Gotham City. The next night he dines with the Moxons, partly to renew his friendship with Mallory. However, he discovers that Mallory is as much a part of the criminal world as her father. She falls in love with Bruce and is protected by Batman. Mallory was still with her father during Bruce's conviction of being a murderer even though she knew what kind of man her father was.
 Amina Franklin: A doctor in Leslie Thompkins' clinic in Gotham City, she dated Bruce Wayne for a short time before she ends things with him. A Russian mobster targeted Amina as a means of avenging himself against her allegedly deceased brother Wayne but Batman arrived in time to prevent him from harming Amina. She was killed by her deranged brother Grotesk, who was revealed to be alive.
 Dawn Golden: One time girlfriend, fiancé and childhood friend of Bruce Wayne. When they first met, Bruce did not like Dawn too much but the two eventually grew closer and ended up dating until she apparently broke Bruce's heart in college. Years later, Dawn would grow into a Gotham socialite but mysteriously go missing. She was actually kidnapped by Killer Croc, hired by a vengeful Penguin whom she had humiliated along with her friends when she invited him in a dance where unattractive men would be their dancing partners. Dawn was eventually found by Batman, she was revealed to be placed in some sort of heating room, awaiting her death. Batman would also protect her from demons sent by her father, Aleister, to kidnap her. Dawn finally dies when her father stabbed her with a knife, completing a ritual that would grant him eternal life.
 Charlotte Rivers: A TV anchorwoman who's visiting Gotham City to cover gruesome slayings and has a romantic relation with Bruce Wayne.
 Natalya Trusevich: A Ukrainian accomplished pianist, and girlfriend to Bruce Wayne. She was killed by Mad Hatter after she refused to reveal Batman's identity, thrown from a helicopter with her body crashed into the Bat-Signal.

In alternate universes
 Laura Avian: In Batman: Masque, Laura is a young and upcoming ballerina who is caught between her two loves. Bruce Wayne and the mysterious Phantom.
 Jessica Dent: In Batman: Earth One, Jessica is Harvey Dent's twin sister and childhood sweetheart of Bruce Wayne. She was President of the Board of Supervisors who, along with her brother, investigated the rumored illicit activities of Mayor Oswald Cobblepot. She was appointed the new Mayor of Gotham City after Cobblepot's death. Jessica and Bruce grew closer and closer through the years and eventually begun dating, ignoring Harvey's dismay. After Harvey's death, Jessica's face was burned with acid and she began losing her mind.
 Glenda Mark: In Batman/Demon: A Tragedy, Glenda was romantically involved with the wealthy eccentric Bruce Wayne in Gotham City. Unbeknownst to either of them, he was a human cage for the evil bat-demon Etrigan. Glenda worked to find a cure for Bruce's fake "allergy to moonlight". Glenda was disturbed that her research showed no record of Bruce Wayne's parents, and every portrait of his ancestors looked identical to Bruce. Etrigan threatens to kill Glenda, and Bruce has his memory wiped to protect her. Despite this, Glenda still dies and Bruce has no memory of ever loving her.
 Janifer St. Cyr: In Batman: Reign of Terror, Janifer is the wife of Captain Bruce Wayne, the revolutionary masked defender of Paris.

In other media

Film

Dr. Chase Meridian (Nicole Kidman): Appears only in Batman Forever as the female lead. Chase was created specifically for the film by screenwriters Janet and Lee Batchler, as they thought that would be more interesting to have Bruce Wayne date a psychoanalyst rather than plucking a typical socialite love interest from the comics. Akiva Goldsman attempted to make the character sexier in subsequent drafts. Kidman described the character as a "criminal psychologist who happens to have sort of the perfect blonde hair and the red lips and wear these sort of tight black dresses. So it's a dichotomy - you have the criminal psychologist who dresses like Jessica Rabbit". Rene Russo was originally cast by Tim Burton for this role whilst he was still the director of the film and when Michael Keaton was still set to play Batman. However, when Burton was fired as Director and rehired as Producer, Keaton quit in disgust. Joel Schumacher, who Burton brought on board in his role as producer, decided to cast a younger Batman, eventually Val Kilmer and decided Russo was too old to play opposite a younger Batman. During recasting, Robin Wright turned down the role while Jeanne Tripplehorn and Linda Hamilton were also both considered. Chase is a psychologist working with the Gotham City police and falls in love with both Batman and Bruce Wayne. She assists Bruce in analyzing a series of befuddling threats sent to him by the Riddler and also witnesses the death of Robin's parents by Two-Face. Later, she learns that Bruce is Batman after he invites her and tells her how he found the cave, and is kidnapped by the Riddler and Two-Face in a trap designed to make Batman choose between her and Robin. In the Riddler's lair, she is chained to the sofa before Batman arrives and when she says Batman will come for her, to which Riddler states that he is "counting on it". She and Robin are both placed in glass jars, bound and gagged, over a pit of water and metal spikes, with the Riddler able to release them at the touch of a button. He plans to determine whether Batman and Bruce Wayne can co-exist, will Batman save Bruce's love or the Dark Knight's partner. Batman saves them both after distracting the Riddler by giving him a riddle. and breaking the device and Chase promises to keep his identity secret. She visits the Riddler after he screams in the asylum he knows Batman's identity, but when she asks him, he says "I am" and shows himself to have made bat-like wings from his clothes. Outside Arkham, Chase meets with Bruce and says that his secret is safe as they kiss. She then gets in a car with Alfred while Batman and Robin leave to patrol Gotham. Her name is a play on words; as a psychologist in love with Bruce Wayne / Batman, she is constantly "chasing" the psychological "middle" of her lover, seeking to reconcile his two halves into one complete lover. In an interview, Kidman commented that she enjoy playing Meridian as a damsel in distress, as it gave her experience for similar roles in the future. A version of Dr. Chase Meridian is introduced in the DC Comics' mainstream continuity with the Herded Limits storyline in Legends of the Dark Knight. The character is visually reimagined as a dark-skinned, red-haired woman to avoid paying Nicole Kidman for likeness royalties. She returns in Infinite Frontier event Shadows of the Bat as a researcher at Arkham Tower under control of the Psycho Pirate.
Rachel Dawes (Katie Holmes/Maggie Gyllenhaal): In Batman Begins, Bruce hopes to become romantically involved with his childhood friend, now an assistant district attorney. He saves her from an attack by a criminal sent to kill her to prevent her prosecuting. She tells him that she cannot be with him until the time Gotham no longer needs Batman. In The Dark Knight, Rachel is in a relationship with Harvey Dent. She is about to agree to marry Dent and writes a note to Bruce Wayne telling him of her choice, reflecting that, while she believes there might come a day when Gotham will no longer need Batman, she no longer believes there will be a time that "Bruce" will not need Batman. However, the mob kidnaps both Rachel and Harvey, resulting in Rachel's death in an explosion while Harvey is accidentally rescued by Batman, as the Joker lies by switching the addresses for Rachel and Harvey, and Harvey's transformation to Two-Face after part of his face is burnt. Alfred later burns the note so that Bruce will believe Rachel would have chosen him, reflecting that sometimes people need to believe that their faith will be rewarded, though in The Dark Knight Rises, which is set eight years later, Alfred reveals the truth to a still-grieving Bruce in an attempt to get him to move on from Batman, which he eventually does by the end of the film beginning a relationship with Selina Kyle. Rachel is said to be loosely based on Julie Madison.

Animation
 Andrea Beaumont (the Phantasm): In the animated film Batman: Mask of the Phantasm, most of the relationship between Bruce and Andrea is told through flashbacks. Andrea was a major factor during Bruce's struggle into becoming Batman. Bruce admitted that the pain of his parents' death had lifted due to Andrea. Bruce decided to abandon his oath and proposed to Andrea. However, Andrea reluctantly gave back the ring the next day and went to Europe with her father, due to complications from the latter's criminal ties to the Valestra mob, though in the letter she lied to Bruce by saying she was young and needed more time, finally pushing him into becoming Batman upon losing his chance at a normal life. Bruce meets Andrea again in the film and is crushed by the discovery of her being the Phantasm, out to avenge the death of her father at the hands of the Valestra gang, primarily the member who killed her father and who would eventually become Batman's greatest enemy the Joker. She next appears in the comic book sequel to the film, where she helps Bruce one more time in stopping Arthur Reeves who was rendered insane by Joker's toxin and then returns in the comic book series Batman Adventures: Shadows and Masks where she tries to infiltrate Black Mask's organisation on the secret orders of the Red Hood (who would later have been revealed to be her supposedly deceased mother, Victoria had the storyline been resolved) and visits Bruce at Wayne Manor asking him not to interfere though he coldly rebukes her, calling her a killer and she later fights Batgirl. She would return decades later, following Bruce's retirement from crime fighting, being hired by the latter's former associate from his Justice League days Amanda Waller to help create a new Batman by murdering the parents of an 8-year-old Terry McGinnis. She initially agreed but backed down later on, angrily citing that doing so would dishonor all that Bruce stood for, although Terry would still become the new Batman by a cruel twist of fate. She later returns in the Batman Beyond comic book universe in "Mark of the Phantasm", where she is hired by Waller again to kill Jake Chill a.k.a Vigilante (the great-grandnephew of Joe Chill, who murdered Bruce's parents) the man who murdered Terry's father, Warren. She meets Bruce again and convinces him to tell Terry the truth. While Bruce admits that he had been searching for Andrea and tries convincing her that it is not too late for them, though she declines stating that she does things Batman is not willing to. She was based on Rachel Caspian.
 Cheetah: In Justice League, Cheetah was a member in a group of villains formed by Lex Luthor that has captured Batman. She was left alone to watch Batman and she told him her origin, and how she sees herself as a freak. Batman told her that he sees a determined woman who's willing to lose everything for a cause she believes in; they then share a kiss. Batman was actually seducing her only to avoid the explosion of a bomb planted there by the villains, the bomb was exploded outside the station and for that Luthor accused her to be a traitor, showing to the rest of the group a tape of the holding cell with Cheetah and Batman kissing. Lex orders Solomon Grundy to take care of Cheetah and he dragged her out of the room.
 Susan Maguire: In the Batman: The Animated Series episode Chemistry, Susan was first seen at Bruce's friend's wedding. Bruce quickly fell for her and he proposed, even deciding to quit as Batman for her, despite scepticism from Dick Grayson. After the wedding, on the honeymoon cruise, Bruce realized that Susan was "too" perfect and it turned out she was a plant-hybrid created by Poison Ivy to inherit Wayne's fortune after Ivy sank the cruise ship, killing Wayne and other rich company owners who had the perfect counterparts created for them as well. When Susan attacked him he locked her in their room, she most likely drowned after Ivy's plants sank the ship. Bruce later determined that his initial feelings for her were likely due to pheromones.
 Margaret Sorrow (Magpie): In Beware the Batman, Magpie attacks a scientist and successfully wipes his memories, catching the attention of Batman. Magpie attempts to goad Batman, declaring that they're very much alike due to the dark design of their costumes. Eventually, she is subdued and arrested by Batman. Magpie is revealed to have developed a romantic obsession with Batman, due to Batman secretly visiting her at Blackgate. Unknown to her, Batman empathized with how Magpie never received the psychiatric help she needed. Upon seeing Katana at Batman's side, Magpie believes that the two are romantically involved and resolves to kill Katana, so she can have Batman all to herself. Magpie is angered when Batman rebuffs her advances but she is later defeated by the duo.
 Dr. Bethanie Ravencroft: In Beware the Batman, Bethanie was a psychologist who formerly experimented on rehabilitating criminals. Bruce Wayne became her patient, when he was trying to find information about a former patient of hers, Magpie, who abducted Bethanie but fortunately Batman saved her. Not being his psychologist anymore they began dating. She later lured Wayne into a trap by the League of Assassins and she was revealed to be in league with Silver Monkey. Lady Shiva drained her soul and imprisoned it within the Soultaker Sword, leaving her alive, but a husk.
 Ava Kirk: In Beware the Batman, a childhood friend of Bruce Wayne, Ava comes back to his life when an army of cloned super soldiers, the Manhunters, controlled by a mysterious organization called The council, try to abduct her to force her thought to be dead father, Paul Kirk, who was the original Manhunter, to return to The council, so they can create more clones. After saving her from the first attack, Bruce asks Ava to stay at his home for the night so she can be safe but later the Manhunters succeed into abducting her from the Wayne Manor. Batman, Katana and Paul save Ava and later Paul says goodbye to his daughter as he leaves to find and stop the rest of the members of The council. Paul asks Batman to take care of Ava and protect her while he will be away. Later, Ava says to Bruce that he kept his promise to her father of being there for her when she was in need and that she is happy they found each other again as she believes Bruce is a unique person. Ava and Bruce begin dating and in one of their dates while they are ready to dance a group of thugs breaks in the restaurant but they are saved by a new masked vigilante, Deathstroke. Later, Bruce as Batman, asks Ava's help to secretly treat a wounded Katana, in the clinic she is working in.
 Samantha Vanaver: In Batman vs. Robin, Samantha is a wealthy woman whose family, like the Waynes, had positions of influence in Gotham for hundreds of years. She dates Bruce Wayne and while they have dinner, Bruce shows to her his plans to make Gotham City a better place. After their dinner, Samantha meets Bruce's son, Damian. On the way to another date with Samantha, Bruce is attacked by white owl-masked people and brought before the Court of Owls, who offer Bruce a chance to join them as a member of one of Gotham's wealthiest families. Later, Talon is revealed to be in a relationship with Samantha, who is secretly the Grandmaster of the Court of Owls. Despite their social class divide, Samantha wants to spare Talon from the ritual of being killed and later be revived as an undead assassin, much like the other Talons. Together they plan to have Robin instead, take his place in the ritual to become the Court's new Talon, which is also part of their plan to destroy Batman, while he will stand by Samantha's side leading the Court. When Talon introduces Robin to the Court of Owls and Damian reveals himself to the Grandmaster, Samantha realizes that if Robin is Bruce's son, then Bruce must be Batman. Ordering Talon to kill Damian and promising they will find a replacement for the ritual, Talon instead turns against the Court of Owls, murdering every member, including Samantha. After he kills her, Talon says he was never one of them, and that Samantha would eventually have done the same to him.
 Barbara Gordon: In the animated adaptation of The Killing Joke, Batgirl has an unrequited crush on Batman that turns physical after a frustrated Batgirl initiates a minor altercation between the two (note that this is a mutually accepted interaction, as Batman reciprocates by kissing her back). It was also confirmed by Barbara herself in Batman Beyond that the two had briefly dated some time after Dick Grayson left Gotham following The New Batman Adventures (her attraction to him is evident in the film Mystery of the Batwoman, which Bruce is uncomfortable about and Alfred and Tim tease him about it), but the relationship ended badly and Barbara began holding a grudge towards him in the future because of this, it is later revealed in Batman Beyond 2.0 comics that Barbara was pregnant with Bruce's unborn child, until she had a miscarriage following a crime fighting related accident and when Dick found out the truth from Bruce, it worsened his already strained relationship with the latter and cut ties with his former mentor and Barbara as well, leading to her marrying Sam Young.

Dick Grayson's love interests
 Barbara Gordon (Batgirl/Oracle): When Barbara started her career as Batgirl working with Batman and Robin, she and Dick began to grow closer time by time and eventually they began a romantic relationship. This relationship became a longtime on-and-off relationship continued even after Barbara's retirement and even after she was paralyzed in The Killing Joke. The two grew closer after the events of "No Man's Land", and became engaged before Infinite Crisis, but they later broke it off when Dick left to help Batman rediscover himself, with Barbara telling him they were not ready for marriage. Both still show feelings towards each other, but are no longer together. Barbara reacted jealously when seeing Dick and Helena Bertinelli kiss, but later kept an eye on Dick while he recovered from Penguin's control and being shot by the new Black Mask (Jeremiah Arkham). In Convergence Nightwing and Oracle #2, Pre New 52 Dick Grayson and Barbara Gordon are married. Following the events of the "City of Bane" storyline, Dick and Barbara adopt a puppy together and shortly thereafter, the two restart their romance.
 In the movie Batman and Robin, Dick meets Barbara Wilson, Alfred's niece, who later becomes Batgirl. In the film, they have the same relationship that Dick has with Barbara Gordon in the comics.
 In the cartoon series Batman: The Animated Series, Dick meets Barbara Gordon, as Batgirl. Both were shown to have similar history as their comic versions. The two have an on/off again relationship. In Batman Beyond 2.0, which a continuation of the DCAU, it is revealed that Dick and Barbara were in a relationship and Dick was going to propose to her, until he learns of her and Bruce's relationship following his departure from Gotham and ultimately cut ties with both of them.
 In Young Justice, the two are childhood friends, with both having crushes on each other as teenagers. The tie-in comic series shows that they have a mutual romantic interest (and implied sexual relationship) with each other as young adults. However, Barbara does not believe that Dick is ready for a serious relationship yet. In Young Justice: Outsiders, Barbara is Oracle, and is in a relationship with Dick Grayson.
 In the Batman: Arkham Unhinged comic tie-in for Batman: Arkham City, it is mentioned that she and Dick had secretly dated. In promotional screenshots for Batman: Arkham Knight, she is seen wearing a Flying Graysons necklace. However, in the game, she is romantically involved with Dick's successor as Robin, Tim Drake.
 In the Earth 2 comics, Dick and Barbara are married with a son, Johnny, in Chicago. It is implied, however, that neither have any association with Batman.
 In the Smallville tie-in comics, Barbara Gordon (who is Nightwing) tells Bruce about her acrobat boyfriend "Richie". Later on, she arranges a meeting between Bruce and Dick.
 In Batman: Nine Lives, Barbara is private detective Dick Grayson's secretary. She has a romantic crush on him, though Dick says he does not like to date his employees.
 Harley Quinn: In the animated film Batman and Harley Quinn, Nightwing tracks down Harley Quinn and finds her supposedly reformed and working at a Hooters-like restaurant called "Superbabes." After a brief fight, Nightwing is knocked out and tied to her bed, and the two are implied to have had a sexual encounter off-screen after Harley admits to being "pretty lonely these last few months."
 Koriand'r (Starfire): Dick Grayson's longest lasting relationship was with the alien princess, Starfire. They dated for 12 years (or 5 years, in comics time). They were also engaged to be married, but their teammate Raven, who had recently turned evil, blew up the priest before he could announce them husband and wife. The relationship was already on unsteady ground, with Kory fearing Dick was rushing into marriage. They eventually broke up. They remained best friends with a few tense moments and kisses in between. It is clearly stated that they still have feelings for each other, but do not want to risk messing it up again.
 In "Titans Tomorrow", a storyline of a potential future, Batwoman (Bette Kane) stated that Starfire would have a wonderful future with Nightwing. However, it is later implied during Infinite Crisis that Dick Grayson is deceased in this timeline.
 The half-blood Mar'i Grayson (Nightstar) was born from their marriage in the Kingdom Come timeline.
 In the Teen Titans animated series, the two of them are shown to be having romantic feelings for one another, but are afraid to act on their feelings fearing one will reject the other, which even other individuals like Cyborg notice. They however finally confess them in the film Teen Titans: Trouble in Tokyo with even Cyborg saying "It's about damn time".

 Bette Kane (Bat-Girl/Flamebird/Hawkfire): Bette has appeared many times as a love interest for Dick Grayson both in comics and in other media. 
 During the Silver Age when Dick was Robin and Bette was Bat-Girl, sidekick to her aunt Batwoman (Kathy Kane), Bette developed a crush on the Boy Wonder which he seemingly reciprocated unlike his mentor who did not return Batwoman's feelings.
 In the comic book tie-in of the TV show Young Justice, Bette spent a night with Dick, whose name she had forgotten. Dick revealed to her that not only he was a little younger than her but in fact they both went to Gotham Academy. Bette said that she wanted to stay with him longer, but she had to go to work.
 Alia (Agent 8): In the comic book Grayson, Dick shares a one-night stand with fellow Spyral agent Alia.
 Bridget Clancy: Bridget Clancy was Dick Grayson's superintendent when he moved to Blüdhaven. The two of them shared a romantic interest, but it never developed into anything. She is Asian in appearance, but has an Irish accent.
 Catwoman: In the Batman Beyond universe, the new Catwoman of Neo-Gotham has teamed up with Dick and Terry McGinnis (Batman) several times. She is last seen in Dick Grayson's bed. While Dick chooses to re-enter the superhero life, she does not.
 Cheyenne Freemont (Nightwing): Cheyenne was a famous fashion designer and at some time a model with an equally famous reputation for her romantic liaisons who first met Dick when they had a one-night stand together. The two formed a purely casual and sexual relationship with her with a "no strings attached" agreement for a while. The relationship did not last long due to Cheyenne wanting to start life for herself and to avoid the metahuman brothers tracking her. She is a closet metahuman who can discharge a mysterious blue energy from her hands.
 Daphne Pennyworth: Alfred's niece, Daphne is an actress and was used by the Old Avon Players to gain the trust of the residents of Wayne Manor and the affections of Dick Grayson to obtain an original copy of Romeo & Juliet which was in Wayne's possession.
 Deborah Poulos: A librarian working at the Museum of the City of New York, Dick meets Deborah while doing research as a museum curator. They have a healthy relationship that ends on friendly terms when Deborah decides to move to San Jose to get away from the violent events that had been occurring in New York.
 Donna Troy (Wonder Girl/Troia): Dick grew up alongside Donna as fellow members of the Teen Titans, with her serving as his second-in-command. While the two are best friends and confidantes, and express that they love each other, their relationship has been portrayed as that of brother and sister. Dick gave Donna away at her wedding to her former husband Terry, and she in turn hosted his own (failed) wedding to Starfire. She even died (albeit not permanently) saving his life. Donna personally recruited Dick (now Batman) into the latest incarnation of the Justice League. Though she angrily criticized his decision to follow Bruce in distancing himself from others, she trusts him completely as their new leader.
 Marv Wolfman, creator of the Nightwing persona and longtime Titans writer, indicated that there was once a Dick and Donna romance planned, but the idea was quashed by editorial mandate.
 Emily Washburn: Emily was a young woman in Gotham City who in three years time had lost three husbands to freak accidents. Nightwing believed she was a black widow and decided to stop her from killing any more men. Thinking he could be her next target, he approached her in his civilian identity of Dick Grayson. They pair became close and Dick proposed. The two were wed in a fake ceremony that Dick staged. During their honeymoon in Hawaii, Dick and Emily ran into Emily's best friend Annelise. Annelise attempted to kill Dick but he was able to overpower her. It turned out that Annelise was attempting to punish Emily by killing any man she fell in love with. Dick learned that Emily's father had gotten Annelise's father arrested and she was trying to get revenge. After Annelise's arrest, Dick revealed his plan to Emily. She was upset that Dick deceived her but grateful that he had cleared her name. Dick then offered to make a life with Emily and her son but she declined stating that Dick had other secrets he could not share with her.
 Huntress (Helena Bertinelli): Dick and Helena had a one-night stand while out patrolling together, to solve the murder of an undercover cop. Dick wanted to start a serious relationship but Helena refused, since then the two have maintained a personal and professional friendship together. Helena reveals that she initially slept with Dick to get closer to learning some of the Batman Family's secrets, but had begun developing feelings for him. After Dick became Batman, the two kissed to blend in at a party while following Thomas Elliot (Hush), resulting in an awkward silence. In the New 52, Helena is considered to be dead in the public while she has been working as a spy in the secret organization known as Spyral. She recruits Dick in the organization too, after he also faked his death, and becomes his partner. During the time the two work together Helena often flirts with Dick, even though it is not permitted by Spyral for its members to become too involved with each other. In the Future's End tie-in issue of Grayson (which occurs five years later), the two are in a romantic relationship.
 Huntress (Helena Wayne): The daughter of Bruce Wayne in the Earth-Two parallel universe. She and Dick become partners after her father's death, with them sharing a seemingly platonic relationship. However, later, it is revealed that she has been secretly in love with him.
 Jesse Chambers (Jesse Quick): Introduced to the Titans team by Wally West, Dick and Jesse share several flirtations early on. When teased by Wally however, Dick states that there is nothing going on between him and Jesse. They do continue to work together, and Dick helps train her.
 Liu: One of Dick's earliest relationships was with a slightly older woman named Liu. The romance was cut short, when she destroyed him emotionally when he found out that she was just using him to get to Bruce.
 Kara Zor-El (Supergirl): Supergirl has been shown to have a strong one-sided crush on Dick, both as Nightwing and Batman, even going as far as kissing him out of surprise. Dick, however, seems to view their relationship more as platonic.
 In Justice League of America (vol. 2) #52, a black kryptonite infected version of Kara, called Dark Supergirl, when confronted by Dick, as Batman, who tells her to choose a side between the Justice League or the Crime Syndicate, Kara responds by kissing him.
 Kate Spencer (Manhunter): In the backup story to Batman: Streets of Gotham, she flirts with, and agrees to go out on a date with Dick Grayson.
 Lori Elton: As a student at Hudson University, he had a relationship with fellow undergraduate Lori Elton, the daughter of a police chief. But when she saw his cold reaction to a classmate's murder, she stopped the tension.
 Rachel Roth (Raven): Dick shared a brief romance with his Teen Titans teammate Raven, going as far as kissing her passionately. It was revealed that Raven (who was experiencing her own emotions for the first time) mistakenly believed she was in love with Nightwing and had unintentionally used her powers to make him reciprocate. Their relationship ended after Starfire explained to Raven the difference between romantic and platonic love.
 Raya Vestri: Raya was a childhood friend to Dick, a trapeze artist at Haly's Circus as well as his first crush, the two began dating even though Raya at first wanted only a sexual relationship. Later, Raya allied with Saiko to kill Dick at a Haly Circus tribute to the Flying Graysons (Dick was present there for a memorial speech), but when she found out Saiko was trying to kill every member and audience of the circus, she betrayed him and turned herself over to the police. Later, the Joker freed Raya from her cell in Blackgate Penitentiary, poisoned her with Joker venom, and forced her to fight Nightwing. Dick injected her with the antidote and Raya died in Dick's arms, telling him she was sorry for everything she had done.
 Selina Kyle (Catwoman):
 In Nightwing (vol. 2) #52, Nightwing and Catwoman run into one another when Catwoman is attempting to steal a rare diamond. In the process, she kisses him, and flirtatiously suggests that they do not tell Batman. Nightwing deduces that she is trying to make Batman jealous, and has a laugh out of it.
 They had a flirtatious team-up in the Batman: The Animated Series episode, "You Scratch My Back", where Catwoman tried, unsuccessfully, to get Nightwing to run away with her after stealing a famed emerald from Argentina. This episode marks one of the few times in Batman history where Catwoman and Nightwing have shared a kiss.
 Shawn Tsang (Defacer): A former graffiti artist and supervillain in Gotham City, Shawn Tsang later relocated to Blüdhaven and became romantically involved with Dick Grayson in the DC Rebirth run of Nightwing. 
 Sonia Zucco: Sonia is the estranged daughter of Tony Zucco, the mobster who murdered Dick Grayson's parents. Trying to step out of her father's shadow by being a legitimate businesswoman, she heads the GGM bank. She was personally involved in the process of approving a GGM loan to Dick Grayson and during their business discussions, Sonia and Dick began a relationship. However, this relationship was strained when Sonia revealed to Dick that her father is still alive. Eventually, Dick shows an interest to re-connecting with her, but is captured by the Crime Syndicate in Forever Evil.

In other media
 Pamela Isley (Poison Ivy): In the live-action film Batman and Robin, at a charity ball Poison Ivy unexpectedly appears to get the Heart of Isis diamond necklace. Blowing around a wisp of pheromone dust, she offers the auctioneers present a night with her. Batman and Robin, also hit by the pheromone dust, get in on the auctioning action themselves. Later on, Poison Ivy focuses on Robin, who is easily swayed by her charms. Batman tries to get Robin to come to his senses about what Poison Ivy is doing to the both of them, but Robin refuses to listen, believing that Batman is jealous and just wants Ivy for himself. Robin later shows up at Poison Ivy's hideout, where she lures him to her private plant-like throne to kiss her. When Ivy tells him of her and Mr. Freeze's plan, Robin realizes he has to stop them but Ivy gets him to kiss her before he takes off, assuming that he will die. Unfortunately, the kiss has no effect, as Robin wore a protective sheath on his lips. Then Batman shows up, ready to take Poison Ivy in.
 Zatanna Zatara: In the TV series Young Justice, Dick flirts with Zatanna when they go on a mission to rescue Red Tornado after she is introduced to the team by her father Zatara. In a later episode Dick explains how he got a magical necklace from Zatanna without her asking questions saying "we have a history". The tie-in comic shows that they had dated, and broken up in the five-year time gap between the two seasons. However, they remain on very friendly (and flirtatious) terms.
 Raquel Ervin (Rocket): In the tie-in comic for Young Justice, Raquel gives Dick a birthday kiss. Zatanna comments on how Dick manages to stay friends with all of his ex-girlfriends, implying that Raquel is one of them.

Terry McGinnis' love interests
 Dana Tan: A student at Hamilton Hill High School, Dana was Terry McGinnis' girlfriend, and later fiancée. She was often annoyed by his many disappearing acts and that was the main reason for breaking up several times during the time they have been together. The two continued dating for 15 years after they left high school, and at some point she learned of his identity as Batman but accepted it. She revealed to Terry that she actually was aware of his double life soon after the death of her brother, Doug, who became the King of the Jokerz. A year after her brother's death, Terry broke up with Dana but at some point they eventually got back together. He constantly warned her that she would be in danger if anyone ever discovered his secret, but, being committed to him, she refused to leave him. When Terry discovered his true lineage, he became disillusioned with his identity and imagined himself breaking up with Dana at last, seeing himself as "cursed". After he came to grips with his past he decided to take care of the people he loves, planning to propose to Dana.
 Melanie Walker (Ten): Melanie is the youngest member of the futuristic version of the Royal Flush Gang. She first met Terry outside of a club where they talked and arranged a date on the next night, at the same place. Much to her dissatisfaction, the Royal Flush Gang had planned to rob a museum that night, during which they were intercepted by Batman. Unaware of his real identity, Ten tackled him, proving to be a capable combatant, but she was eventually overpowered by Batman's superior strength. Eventually Terry found out about her identity and, after he saved her life, he handed her over to the authorities. Terry saw that she was someone that could be saved from the career in crime that her family had decided on for her. At some point, Melanie got estranged from her family, leaving her criminal career in the past and leading an honest life. Melanie never found out that Terry and Batman were the same person. When Terry asks Bruce if he ever faced a situation like his complicated relationship with Melanie, Wayne good-naturedly alludes to his relationship with Selina Kyle. More than a year later, Terry finds out that Melanie is taking classes at Neo-Gotham University, as he does. They meet and Melanie confesses to him that she saw him a few weeks ago but she was not sure whether to say hi. Terry asks her if she has reunited with her criminal family and she responds that she has been on her own for a while now, but Terry seems not to truly believe her because of their history. Later, Terry, as Batman, who is watching Melanie as she walks alone, helps her defeat some thugs who attempt to attack her in the street. After that, Terry has begun seeing Melanie again.
 In the parallel Earth of the Justice Lords, Terry McGinnis is in a relationship with Melanie and they are both members of the Jokerz.
 Mareena/Marina (Aquagirl): Mareena was the only member of the Justice League who was friendly to Terry when he was first introduced to the team as, after they met, she invited him for a swim. During the swimming session, the tank was sabotaged with the water's temperature having been raised, so Mareena was trapped inside, but fortunately Batman blasted the door, freeing Aquagirl and saving her life. After that, Mareena grew even fonder of him. Through the years, the two grew much closer and they were several hints at some kind of attraction between the two. When Batman refused to join the League, Aquagirl proposed to visit Neo-Gotham and make a personal appeal herself, indicating that Terry is closer to Aquagirl than anyone else on the League. When Terry is forced to fight the Justice League, Bruce Wayne tells him to attack Aquagirl, referring to her as the one Terry likes. Terry hesitates so Aquagirl, who is surprised by his behavior, attacks him first, but later she is the one who calms everyone down and proposes to listen to Batman, as she believes he has a reason for his doings. Later, Terry thanks Mareena for her help and she says to him that if he ever needs a person he can trust, she hopes he will consider her. Initially, Mareena's relationship with Terry was platonic but it developed into a good friendship, as she is now Warhawk's love interest.
 Catwoman: A new Catwoman, not related to Selina Kyle, has come to Neo-Gotham, hired by the new Hush to spy on Batman, Terry McGinnis. When Terry first meets her, while pursuing her, he seems very excited and states that he wanted a Catwoman his whole career and that Batman and Catwoman are supposed to be a thing but she quickly discards him saying she is too much for him to handle. Hush betrays her and then attempts to murder her but fortunately Batman prevents him from doing so. After Terry gets hurt, she helps patch up Batman's wounds, while being guided by Bruce Wayne. Terry later thanks her for saving his life by giving her a kiss. Though originally at odds with Batman, the new Catwoman eventually develops a soft spot for him. She later teams up with Terry and Dick Grayson against the Jokerz. Her real name is not mentioned, but she reveals that she is the daughter of the villain Multiplex, explaining her ability to create up to nine physical copies of herself.

Jason Todd's love interests
Rose Wilson/Ravager: In Red Hood and the Outlaws, part of the New 52 run of the DC Comics, Jason confirms that he and Rose had a one-time fling. In the 2018 Titans TV series, Rose appears in the second season, and has a romance with Jason for part of it. The two become romantically involved in DCeased: Unkillables before getting married prior to the events of DCeased: Dead Planet.
Koriand'r/Starfire: In Red Hood and the Outlaws set in the New 52 continuity, Jason reveals that he was found on an island injured and on brink of death by Kory who nursed him back to health. The two then attempted a romantic relationship but it did not work out. Jason considers her a dear friend and is also aware of his Robin predecessor Dick Grayson's relationship with her but told Kory that if he gets used to kissing her to shoot him.
Artemis of Bana-Mighdall: Wonder Woman's fellow Amazon sister Artemis and Jason both became attracted to one another while he worked alongside her and other outlaws.

Tim Drake's love interests
 Ariana Dzerchenko is an immigrant from Russia who moved to Gotham City with her family, making their home in the Little Odessa neighborhood. She met Tim when he rescued her father, who owned a printer shop, from a gang. A second attack on her father was successful and resulted in his death at the hands of KGBeast, and she moves in with her uncle Vari and aunt Natalie. Tim's relationship with Ariana is one aspect of his life that is normal for a teenager, but his secrecy and preoccupation frustrates her repeatedly. Ariana is forced to break up with Tim after her uncle finds them in a compromising position and transfers her to an all-girl school, but they later get back together. Tim becomes involved with Stephanie Brown during their relationship, and he decides to break up with Ariana to be with Stephanie, only for Ariana to break up with him first because she thinks they're too young for a serious relationship.
 Spoiler (Stephanie Brown): Stephanie adopts the moniker of Spoiler to capture her criminal father the Cluemaster, and she assists Batman and Robin in his arrest. Spoiler later helps Robin out during several missions, saving his life once and, in thanks, he gives her a kiss. After that, she begins to regularly patrol the city with Robin, and they develop a mutual crush even though he is dating Ariana (which Stephanie does not know). They start dating after Tim breaks up with Ariana, but he doesn't reveal his real identity to her. Batman ultimately reveals Tim's real identity to Stephanie, which upsets Tim, who storms out on them when he finds out. Regardless, they continue dating until she fakes her death at the end of Batman: War Games. Later, when they're Red Robin and Batgirl, Tim tries to restart their relationship, but Stephanie rejects him because he wasn't good for her. During Batgirl: Convergence, the pre-"Flashpoint" versions of Tim and Stephanie get back together. In the DC Rebirth continuity, they are in a relationship once again. In the film Batman Beyond: Return of the Joker (2000), the producers believe the older Tim Drake's blonde wife to be Stephanie. Stephanie appears in the second season of the Young Justice series, briefly interacting with him and by the events of Young Justice: Outsiders has joined the team as Spoiler, later leaving with him by joining Batman Inc. and also being part of his separate team within it. 
Cassie Sandsmark/Wonder Girl: In the Titans Tomorrow comic, in an attempt to alter Batman's memories, Cassie kisses Tim, though it enrages Conner, she then forms a relationship with him eight years later. In the animated show, Young Justice, Tim and Cassie form a relationship at the end of the second season, after Wally West's death gave Cassie the courage to kiss him. and after Tim leaves the team at the beginning of the third season by joining Batman Inc., Cassie tries to patch things with him.
M'gann Morzz/Miss Martian: In the Titans Tomorrow comic, Tim although he is in a relationship with Cassie also has an affair with M'gann while they are colluding with Lex Luthor.
Barbara Gordon/Oracle: In the Batman: Arkham series, Tim and Barbara are shown to care deeply for one another as seen in Arkham City and Arkham Knight, the latter game in which Tim is shown to be very distressed after Barbara is kidnapped by Scarecrow. The two eventually get married at the conclusion of the game, presumably sometime after Batman's apparent death.
Bernard Dowd: In Batman: Urban Legends, Tim goes on a date with Bernard, and talks about dating with him.

Damian Wayne's love interests
Rachel Roth/Raven: In the DC Animated Movie Universe film Justice League vs. Teen Titans, Damian and Raven meet and form a close bond that only grows further in Teen Titans: The Judas Contract and Justice League Dark: Apokolips War, the latter film by which both of them have developed romantic feelings for each other and after Damian is killed by Darkseid trying to protect his brainwashed father, Raven is shocked and heartbroken but she manages to successfully revive him turning white in the process. The two share their first and only kiss at the conclusion of the film as Flash resets the timeline.
Nika/Flatline: In the 2021-2022 DC comic series Robin, Damian meets Flatline while attending the Lazarus Tournament. While the two characters start off with a competitive relationship, they grow closer over the course of the tournament. This budding relationship culminates into a kiss in Issue #11.

Supporting characters
 Harold Allnut: A mute and hunchbacked man who serves as a trusted mechanic and aide to Batman, helping to design, build, and repair that superhero's equipment. Created by writers Dennis O'Neil and Alan Grant, the character first appeared in The Question #33 (December 1989).
 Joe Chill: The mugger who killed Bruce's parents.
 Carrie Kelley: Debuted as Robin in The Dark Knight Returns, entered the DCU in 2013 in Batman and Robin as Damian Wayne's acting instructor.
 Robin (Matt McGinnis): Terry McGinnis' younger brother and Bruce Wayne's other biological son. Featured in the animated TV series Batman Beyond and its comics versions. Currently a part of the Future DCU; knows that Bruce Wayne was Batman and under Wayne's personal tutelage became the next Robin.
 Aunt Harriet Cooper, the maternal aunt of Dick Grayson, who appeared in the Batman comics and TV series in the 1960s.
 Henri Ducard: A French detective, Ducard is one of Wayne's few teachers who has had a continuing presence in the comics such as The Man Who Falls and Blind Justice, having taught a young Bruce Wayne the art of the manhunt. Ducard's moral ambiguity led to future conflicts with Batman. In the movie Batman Begins, Ducard appears as Wayne's mentor in crime fighting, but it later turns out that he was actually Ra's al Ghul in disguise. In The New 52 series Batman and Robin, he trains his son Morgan in the art of assassinating under the name "NoBody".
 Dr. Thomas Elliot: A surgeon introduced in the Hush storyline, Thomas Elliot is a childhood friend of the Wayne family. Elliot and Wayne parted ways at a young age, after the death of Elliot's father. Dr. Elliot is later revealed to be secretly insane since childhood and leading a double life as the criminal mastermind Hush.
 Legs: A homeless Vietnam veteran and resident of the streets of Gotham City. The character was frequently featured in cameo appearances in various Batman comics during the 1980s and 1990s. The character has not been utilized in published material since the late 1990s and has fallen into obscurity.
 Professor Carter Nichols: A hypnotist who developed a form of "time travel hypnosis" that led into many time travel adventures for Batman, Robin and even Superman in the 1940s and 1950s.
 Daphne Pennyworth: The niece of Alfred Pennyworth and daughter of Wilfred Pennyworth, briefly appeared in the late 1960s/early 1970s.
 Lady Shiva: One of the most feared assassins in the world, Lady Shiva has often been a foe of Batman. However, after Batman broke his back fighting Bane, he went to Lady Shiva for training.
 Bronze Tiger trained under Batman's ninja master Kirigi and was a member of the Sensei's League of Assassins (albeit brainwashed), at one point teaching Cassandra Cain. Tiger would best Batman in a battle during his mission, leading members of the League to slay Kathy Kane. Thanks to Amanda Waller, he would be freed of the Sensei's programming and would return as an ally to Batman.
 Dr. Leslie Thompkins: A lifelong friend of Thomas Wayne and Bruce's godmother. She is a strict pacifist and used to run a rehabilitation clinic for criminals and drug addicts. She had a temporary falling-out with the Dark Knight after Stephanie Brown's apparent death.
 Alice Chilton: Bruce Wayne's nanny after the loss of his parents. She was Joe Chill's mother, a fact only Alfred was aware of.
 Slam Bradley: A private detective that largely operates out of Gotham, Bradley became good friends with Catwoman. Bradley's son, called Slam Bradley Jr., is a cop in Gotham and the father of Catwoman's daughter.
 Vigilante (Dorian Chase): Brother of Adrian Chase and a murderous crimefighter that first troubled Nightwing and proved to be a formidable fighter before crossing swords with Batman.
 Lock-Up: Initially an overzealous vigilante, Lock-Up would be tolerated during the events of No Man's Land as he controlled Blackgate Prison. However, he was seen acting alongside villains during Infinite Crisis.

Trainers of Bruce Wayne
The following have trained Bruce Wayne in his path to becoming Batman:

 Kirigi: Batman's instructor in ninjutsu who would also train several members of the League of Assassins.
 David Cain: World-renowned assassin who trained Bruce Wayne.
 Tsunemoto: An assassin for the Yakuza who trained Bruce Wayne.
 Chu Chin Li: A master of kung fu who trained Bruce Wayne.
 Fatman: The imitator of Batman who helped him and became a hero.

Wayne family

This section lists the ancestors and relatives of Bruce Wayne:

 Abigail Wayne - Wife of Benjamin Wayne, mother of Wilhemina Wayne.
 Agatha Wayne - The aunt of Bruce Wayne.
 Alan Wayne - The son of Solomon Wayne and the great-great-grandfather of Bruce Wayne. Alan Wayne was the founder of Wayne Shipping. In The New 52, Alan Wayne was one of the victims of the Court of Owls.
 Benjamin Wayne - son of Silas II, husband of Abigail Wayne and father of Wilhemina Wayne.
 Bruce N Wayne - Youngest son of Silas II, a private investigator, and first cousin once removed to Bruce Wayne who was named after him.
 C. L. Wayne - Gave money to the Gotham Botanical Gardens In 1870.
 Caleb Wayne - Lead wagon trails though Native American territory.
 Catherine van Derm - The wife of Alan Wayne and the great-great-grandmother of Bruce Wayne. She died giving birth to Kenneth Wayne.
 Celestine Wayne- She was the Daughter of Zebediah Wayne. She was promised to the eldest son of the Elliot Family but as raped by Caleb Dumas. her brother Jonathan killed Caleb and the Waynes ran the Dumas out of Gotham in retaliation. She than died an old maid never marrying or having children.
 Charles Wayne - The son of Darius Wayne. Died at 52 of tuberculosis and left everything to his three sons Solomon, Joshua and Zebediah Wayne.
 Constance Wayne - The wife of Patrick Wayne and the mother of Agatha, Thomas, Philip and Helen Wayne. She is the grandmother of Bruce Wayne. Had a very cold relationship with her husband.
 Contarf Wayne - Lord of Waynemoor castle during the early 1600s.
 Darius Wayne - An ancestor of Bruce Wayne and the fictional brother of Anthony Wayne who fought in the American Revolutionary War. He was the architect behind Wayne Manor.
 Dorothea Wayne - The wife of Solomon Wayne and the great-great-great-grandmother of Bruce Wayne.
 Edmond Wayne - In 1685 he battled and killed the serial killer Lafayette Arkham. He is an ancestor of Bruce Wayne. He was the first Wayne to live in Gotham.
 Elwood Wayne - He was the brother of Silas II and Patrick Wayne. He died an old man and divide up his share of the family fortune between surviving members.
 Emelyn Wayne- A priest that lives in Asia and the oldest son of Silas II.
 Harold of Waynemoor - He was one of the architects of Waynemoor castles in Scotland and was murdered by his own brother Lorin.
 Helen Wayne - The youngest child of Patrick and Constance Wayne. She was kidnapped in 1961 at two months old and was killed. She is the younger sister of Agatha, Thomas and Philip Wayne. As well as the anut of Bruce Wayne.
 Henry Wayne - Worked closely with his cousin Alan Wayne in building Wayne Tower in the heart of Gotham. He had one son Jack Wayne.
 Herkimer Wayne - A Major-General During the war of 1812. 
 Horatio Wayne - General during the Revolutionary War.
 Ismeal Wayne - A great whaling captin.
 Jack Wayne - The son of Henry Wayne. He fought in World War I and was a big part of Gotham in the 1930s. 
 Jane Wayne - Daughter of Philip Wayne. She was married a had a son named Junior.
 Jeremy Wayne - A member of the Wayne family that lives in Australia. Unknown his relation to Bruce Wayne.
 Jonah Wayne - Helped protect Gotham From the Great Depression. He married Mildred Wayne and had one son Richard Wayne. 
 Jonathan Wayne - He was the son of Zebediah Wayne and the brother of Celestine Wayne. He had one son Tiberius K. Wayne.
 Joshua Wayne - The brother of Solomon and Zebediah Wayne, the uncle of Alan Wayne, and the great-great-great-uncle of Bruce Wayne. He died freeing a group of slaves on the underground railroad.
 Kenneth Wayne - The son of Alan Wayne, father of Elwood, Silas II, Patrick Wayne and the great-grandfather of Bruce Wayne. He also created Wayne Chemicals.
 Laura Wayne - The wife of Kenneth Wayne. Lead Wayne Enterprises after Kenneth's death while raising her three sons.
 Lorin of Waynemoor - He was one of the architects of Waynemoor castles. He also murdered his own brother Harold. Lorin is also an ancestor of Bruce Wayne.
 Martha Wayne - The mother of Bruce Wayne. She was killed by Joe Chill during a mugging.
 Mildred Wayne - She was the wife of Jonah Wayne and the mother of Richard Wayne.
 Mordecai Wayne - A Puritan ancestor of Bruce Wayne whose portrait hangs in Wayne Manor. He was also the brother to Nathaniel Wayne.
 Nathaniel Wayne - He was an ancestor of Bruce Wayne from the first generation of the Wayne family. Under the alias of Brother Malleus, Nathaniel was the leader of Gotham's people who hunted and killed witches. It was because of this that the Wayne family was cursed upon him burning a supposed witch named Annie.
 Patrick Wayne - The son of Kenneth and Laura Wayne. He is the father of Helen, Thomas, Agatha, and Phillip Wayne as well as the Grandfather of Bruce Wayne.
 Philip Wayne - The uncle of Bruce Wayne and the brother of Thomas Wayne. He would raise Bruce for a while after the loss of his parents. In "The New 52", Philip is the brother of Martha Wayne. He later gave his life to protect Batman from Red Hood I during their fight at Ace Chemicals.
 Preston Wayne - He fonded Wayne Motors. He had one son Jonah Wayne.
 Richard Wayne - He was the son of Jonah and Mildred Wayne. He fought in the Vietnam War and was killed in action.
 Silas Wayne - A silversmith who is an ancestor of Bruce Wayne from 1787. He was used by Henry to take the blame for Henry's highwayman activities since Silas loved Henry's sister Martha as a way to protect Martha's mother. Benjamin Franklin gives Silas Wayne a letter which proves his innocence to be used after Martha's mother dies. However, Silas dies first. Bruce later finds the letter hidden inside Silas Wayne's portrait and Silas is finally cleared one hundred years later.
 Silas Wayne II - Older brother to Elwood and Patrick Wayne. Father of Emelyn, Benjamin and Bruce N. Wayne. He was against his great-nephew Bruce Wayne's Playboy antics. On his death bed, Bruce revealed that he was Batman and Silas died happy knowing Bruce was a true Wayne.
 Sir Gaweyen de Weyne - A member of the family who was of French descent. Died fighting in the Crusades. He is an ancestor of Bruce Wayne.
 Solomon Wayne - The father of Alan Wayne, the brother of Joshua and Zebediah Wayne, the husband of Dorothea Wayne, and the great-great-great-grandfather of Bruce Wayne. During the 19th century, he worked as a judge in Gotham City. He died at the age of 104.
 Thomas Wayne - The father of Bruce Wayne. He was killed by Joe Chill during a mugging.
 Thomas Wayne, Jr. - Bruce Wayne's older brother. It has been said Thomas suffered brain injuries in infancy and was relegated to a life of care. However, one story tells of him being left catatonic after the death of their parents and institutionalized. The brothers' uncle had told Bruce his brother had, in fact, died. Thomas would recover and choose to live a reclusive existence as an acrobat in a traveling circus. However, he would be brainwashed into becoming an assassin. The hero Deadman learned of this and decided to take over his life. Batman would later learn these facts and try to reclaim his brother. While Thomas was free of Deadman, he gave his life to save Batman by diving in front of a hail of bullets from his criminal companions.
 Tiberius K. Wayne - The son of Jonathan Wayne he became a banker. He had two sons Henry and Preston.
 Vanderveer Wayne Sr. - Son of Philip Wayne, and first cousin of Bruce Wayne. Unlike his cousin, he did not have a good relationship with his father. As a result of that he spoiled his son Vanderveer Jr.
 Vanderveer "Van" Wayne Jr. - The spoiled rich cousin of Bruce Wayne.
 Winslow Wayne- Fought alongside Theodore Roosevelt in the rough riders.
 Wilhemina Wayne - The orphan daughter of Benjamin and Abigail Wayne, making her Bruce Wayne's second cousin. She currently lives in South Africa.
 Zebediah Wayne - He was the founder of Wayne Enterprises. He had two children Jonathan and Celestine Wayne.

Kane family
This is the family that Martha Wayne is from, making them relatives of Batman and Batwoman:

 Jacob Kane - The father of Kate Kane, brother of Martha Wayne, and uncle of Bruce Wayne and Bette Kane.
 Beth Kane - The twin sister of Kate Kane. After being presumed dead, she resurfaces years later as the villainous Alice.
 Catherine Hamilton - The second wife of Jacob Kane and stepmother of Kate Kane who is the heir to the Hamilton Rifle Company arms fortune.
 Catherine Hamilton-Kane appears in Batwoman, portrayed by Elizabeth Anweis. This version is one of Gotham's most powerful citizens who made her fortune as a defense contractor and the CEO of Hamilton Dynamics. Alice manipulated events that caused her to confess to her corrupt ways upon the Wonderland Gang's infiltration of an event and Catherine starts to collapse from the poison that was placed in her drink. As Mary was also poisoned, Catherine sacrifices her life to allow Mary to live by drinking the antidote containing the Desert Rose plant. Before passing away, Catherine states that she knew of Mary's clinic and is proud of her. At the time when the complications of both versions of Beth Kane being on Earth-Prime start to worsen, Alice hallucinates seeing Catherine's ghost. Season two revealed that some of Catherine's other experiments have included working to cure Aaron Helzinger and doing research on the Desert Rose which also earned Catherine the hatred of Safiyah Sohail and the dismay of Jacob.
 Catherine Hamilton-Kane appears in Gotham Knights, voiced by Liz Burnette.
 Gabrielle Kane - The wife of Jacob Kane and mother of Kate and Beth. She was killed by terrorists.
 Cameron Kane - The ancestor of Kate Kane who is an industrialist.
 Robert Kane - The ancestor of Kate Kane and the son of Cameron Kane. He died protecting his father from an attack by Nicholas Gate. Following Robert's death, Cameron named a bridge he developed after him called the Robert H. Kane Memorial Bridge.
 Roderick Kane - The father of Martha Wayne and Jacob Kane and the grandfather of Kate Kane and Bruce Wayne. After he had had a stroke, Roderick was confined to an iron lung and could not speak well.

Supporting characters in other media
 Detective Ethan Bennett (appeared in The Batman, voiced by Steve Harris) - A GCPD detective who, unlike Chief Angel Rojas and Detective Ellen Yin, supports Batman's motives and is Bruce Wayne's best friend. He appeared in the majority of season one. At the end of the first season, he becomes Clayface after being exposed to the Joker's "Joker Putty". He attempts to kill both Chief Rojas and the Joker, but is stopped and defeated by the efforts of Batman and Detective Yin. He reappeared in the season two episode "Meltdown", where he attempts to reform, but he fails and goes on a crime spree as Clayface. He is defeated again by Batman. In "Grundy's Night", he impersonated Solomon Grundy to get revenge on Batman, but fails. In his final appearance, "Clayfaces", he breaks out of prison and he helps Batman and Robin battle another Clayface, Basil Karlo. In the end, he and Karlo are cured, and Bennett tries again to restore his image.
 Detective Ellen Yin (appeared in The Batman, voiced by Ming-Na Wen) - Yin is a new transfer to the GCPD since she left Metropolis. During the first season, she opposed Batman as a vigilante and tries to capture and unmask him. After she helps Batman fight Clayface at the first season's finale, she grudgingly accepts Batman as a vigilante and goes from being his enemy to his ally. Her final appearance was in the season two finale.
 Chief Angel Rojas (appeared in The Batman, voiced by Edward James Olmos in his first appearance, Jesse Corti in other appearances) - Chief Rojas is the head of the GCPD and does things by the book. Unlike Detective Bennett, who sees Batman as a hero, Rojas distrusts Batman and sees him as a potential threat to all of Gotham. While he did fire Ellen after she was caught talking with Batman, he gave Ellen her badge back on Commissioner Gordon's orders. The character was dropped after season two.
Chief Miles Clancy O'Hara (appeared in the 1966 Batman TV series and film, portrayed by Stafford Repp) - Commissioner Gordon's right-hand man. As a foil to highlight Batman's brilliant deductions, he is often presented as dim-witted, but his heart is in the right place. A female version of the character appears in The Lego Batman Movie, voiced by Lauren White.
 Alexander Knox (appeared in Batman, portrayed by Robert Wuhl) - A reporter for the Gotham Globe. In the film, he works with Vicki Vale to investigate Batman's actions. When Vicki becomes suspicious of Bruce's actions, she asked Knox to show footage of the alley where Bruce's parents were killed. During the climax, Knox is nearly killed after being exposed to the Joker's gas. At the end of the film, he recovers from his injuries. In the early scripts of the film, Knox was set to die in the parade, but the producers convinced Tim Burton not to kill Knox. His name is a reference to Alexander Knox. Alexander Knox later appeared in Crisis on Infinite Earths Pt. 1 reprised by Robert Wuhl. He was seen reading the newspaper when he witnesses the sky turning read as he hopes that Batman is looking to the sky.
 Lieutenant Maxwell "Max" Eckhardt (appeared in Batman, portrayed by William Hootkins) - Eckhardt is a corrupt police officer who works for crime boss Carl Grissom and criminal Jack Napier (who will later become the Joker in the film). He is later betrayed and killed by Napier before Napier becomes the Joker.
 Fred Stickley (appeared in Batman Forever, portrayed by Ed Begley Jr.) - Edward Nygma's ill-tempered supervisor at Wayne Enterprises. At the beginning of the film, he terminated Edward Nygma's invention when he feared it would cause Wayne Enterprises to go bankrupt. When he learned about Nygma's true intention of the invention, Nygma killed him in retaliation and used computer forgery to make it look like Stickley killed himself.
 Dr. Lee (appeared in Batman Forever and Batman & Robin, portrayed by Michael Paul Chan) - Dr. Lee is a research scientist at Wayne Enterprises. He made a cameo appearance in Forever, where he comforted Edward Nygma. He had a more important role in the sequel, where he and another research scientist were kidnapped by Mr. Freeze. They were rescued by the efforts of Batman, Robin, and Batgirl.
 Dr. Penelope "Penny" Young (appeared in Batman: Arkham Asylum, voiced by Cree Summer) - An Arkham Asylum employee who aids Batman in stopping Joker from taking over the institute. Shortly before the events of the game, Young performed experiments on Bane to create a drug known as Titan, a much more powerful version of the drug Venom that is designed for the Asylum's patients to survive gruesome therapies. During the events of Arkham Asylum, after saving Dr. Young from the Joker's goons and defeating Bane, Batman deduces that the Joker planned the assault on Arkham for months and that Young knew that Joker was using her research to create an army of super soldiers; her denial had forced the Joker to return to the Asylum. Fighting off the Scarecrow's fear toxin, Batman destroys the remainder of Young's Titan formula, but as Dr. Young arrives to the Warden'a office to recover the rest of the formula in a safe, she was held captive by serial killer Victor Zsasz. Batman manages to save her from Zsasz. As she attempts to recover the formula from the safe, she discovers it is booby-trapped, and an explosion occurs, killing Young in the process. Posthumously, she is mentioned in a side mission in Batman: Arkham City, where Bane and Batman forms an uneasy alliance to destroy what was left of the Titan formula that was hidden across Arkham City.
 Special Agent Iman Avesta (appeared in Batman: The Enemy Within, voiced by Emily O'Brien) - An employee of Amanda Waller, a field agent of the Agency and a Gotham native. Avesta is a fan of Batman and serves as an aide to Batman when she was selected to help find and dismantle a criminal organization called the Pact. Later, Avesta joined other Agency operatives in an attempt to capture the Riddler, wanting to impress Batman but was captured by the Riddler. Held in death traps, Riddler taunted and tortured the group until Batman arrived and rescued Avesta. As Iman thanked Batman, the floor beneath them dropped and a giant cage closed around them. The Riddler then tries to force Batman into an unfair game, forcing him to solve riddles to save the other agents, but at the cost of Avesta's hearing. Avesta urged Batman to save her comrades instead of herself, asking Batman to go along with the Riddler's twisted game, so she can sacrifice her hearing even though it meant that she would likely die in the process. If Batman solved the riddles, Avesta distracts the criminal long enough for Batman to figure out a way to escape the cage. Avesta shows her gratitude but is rendered deaf, leading the vigilante to embrace her in comfort. Avesta would later wear hearing aids to restore her lost sense. It is later revealed that she already knew his true identity of Bruce Wayne, and had passed this information to Waller. She is later willing to work with him and give information about Waller's most private of information. She would also help him during either Waller's manhunt for him or the Joker's reign of terror. After the incident, Bruce can offer her a job at Wayne Enterprises, which she would accept.
 Tiffany Fox (appeared in Batman: The Enemy Within, voiced by Valarie Rae Miller) - The daughter of Lucius Fox and an employee at Wayne Enterprises. She was the only one of the children that shared her father's love of technology and gadgets as led her to befriend Bruce Wayne and Alfred during Season 2. During the New 52, Tiffany lived with her family in Gotham City, under the protection of Batwing. After a trip to Africa, Batwing attracted the attention of the Marabunta, which swarmed the Fox home and attacked Tiffany's family. This forced the family to relocate to a more public location until things could settle down. Eventually Russell Tavaroff wanted revenge on Batwing for a childhood incident and decided to join with Rat Catcher to kidnap Tiffany and her sister Tamara Fox. Tamara was eventually driven insane by the Rat Catcher, leaving Tiffany alone with him as bait to draw Batwing into the sewers below Gotham City. Tiffany fought her captors and escaped to the upper levels of the sewers where she found Batwing, who revealed himself to be her brother. Together they escaped to the hospital where they were reunited once again.

Characters from alternate continuities
Several characters featured outside of modern Batman canon are of note:
	 
 Batman (Terry McGinnis) is the lead character in the animated series Batman Beyond. Set in Earth-12, one of 52 parallel Earths to the original Earth-0, the series depicts the adventures of a new, younger Batman mentored by Bruce Wayne. In this continuity, Batman treats Terry similarly to the way Bruce treated Dick Grayson and Tim Drake in the main continuity. Bruce has a respect for him and has found him to be a worthy person to wear the mask and that he is the one that makes Batman a good person. In the Justice League Unlimited episode "Epilogue", it is revealed that Terry is the biological son of Bruce due to Amanda Waller's involvement in creating a new Dark Knight under Project Cadmus' final project, Project: Batman Beyond. In 2011, he entered the official DCU.
 Batman (Tlano) is an alien that brought Batman to his world Zur-En-Arrh to help him become his planet's hero and to battle robot invaders piloted by an unnamed alien race.
 Harvey Harris: Harvey Harris was a detective from Gotham City (Earth-One continuity). He trained young Bruce Wayne in the art of criminal detection and provided the young boy with his first costumed identity - Robin. Bruce helped his mentor try to stop the KKK in Detective Comics Annual in 1989. Harris is good in combat, claims to have a black belt and uses a gun.
 Carrie Kelley: Carrie Kelly became the first female Robin (chronologically, though not canonically) in 1986's Batman: The Dark Knight Returns. In Batman: The Dark Knight Strikes Again, the follow-up to DKR, Carrie is called Catgirl, as an homage to Catwoman. In The Dark Knight III: The Master Race, she became Batwoman. In 2013, she entered the official DCU.
 Huntress (Helena Wayne): Pre-Crisis, the Huntress was Helena Wayne, daughter to Earth-Two's Bruce Wayne and Selina Kyle (Catwoman). In 2011, she entered the official DCU. Another Huntress (Helena Bertinelli) has no biological relations to Catwoman or Batman.
 Blackwing (Charlie Bullock) was a lawyer that become a hero patterned after Batman (after the hero's death) on Earth-Two. He would team with that Earth's Huntress.
 The Ninja (Kyodai Ken) was Bruce Wayne's rival in the way of the samurai under Yoru in Batman: The Animated Series. He would later return as an enemy in the series.
 Proto-Bot was a prototype Bat-Bot introduced in Batman: The Brave and the Bold.
 Sarah Essen (aka Sarah Essen Gordon) is in most continuities the wife or love interest of Police Commissioner James Gordon. She is Gordon's former partner and later takes up the mantle as the Commissioner after Jim is demoted by Mayor Armand Krol. She was first seen in Batman #405. Essen Gordon first appeared in Batman #405 and was created by Frank Miller and David Mazzucchelli's Batman Year One.

See also

 List of Green Arrow supporting characters
 List of Superman supporting characters
 List of Wonder Woman supporting characters
 List of Green Lantern supporting characters
 List of Aquaman supporting characters

References

Lists of supporting characters in comics
Supporting